Hindman (usually ) is a surname. Notable people with the surname include:

Bill Hindman (1922–1999), American actor
Daniel T. Hindman (1839–1915), American politician
Darwin Hindman (1933–2019), American politician
Dorothy Hindman (born 1966), American composer and music educator
Earl Hindman (1942–2003), American actor
George W. Hindman (died 1878), American cowboy and law enforcement officer
James R. Hindman (1839–1912), 23rd Lieutenant Governor of Kentucky
Jessica Chiccehitto Hindman (born 1981), American author and English professor
Stan Hindman (1944–2020), American football player
Thomas C. Hindman (1828–1868), American lawyer, politician and Confederate Army major general in the American Civil War
Trent Hindman (born 1995), American racing driver
William Hindman (1743–1822), American politician

See also
Hyndman, another surname